Germany was represented by Lale Andersen, with the song "Einmal sehen wir uns wieder", at the 1961 Eurovision Song Contest, which took place on 18 March in Cannes, France. "Einmal sehen wir uns wieder" was chosen at the German national final held on 25 February.

Andersen was arguably the best-known singer yet to have taken part at Eurovision, being famous throughout Europe and beyond as the originator of "Lili Marleen", one of the most iconic songs of the Second World War. Aged 55 on the night of the contest, she was also the oldest, a record she would hold until 57-year-old Dado Topić took to the stage for Croatia in 2007.

Before Eurovision

National final
The national final was held on 25 February at the Kurtheater in Bad Homburg vor der Höhe, hosted by Heinz Schenk. Thirteen songs took part, with the winner being decided by a 21-member jury. It is not known by what method the songs were scored, and only the top four placements are currently known. One of the other participants was Christa Williams, who had represented Switzerland at Eurovision in 1959.

At Eurovision 
On the night of the final Lale Andersen performed 8th in the running order, following Sweden and preceding France. The song featured Andersen's trademark spoken-word singing style and was also unusual for including a refrain sung entirely in French, which was legitimate as at the time the European Broadcasting Union had yet to introduce any specific rules regarding language of performance. However "Einmal sehen wir uns wieder" failed to find much favour with the international jurors, picking up just 3 points and placing Germany 13th of the 16 entries. The German jury awarded 5 of its 10 points to contest winners Luxembourg.

Voting 
Every country had a jury of ten people. Every jury member could give one point to his or her favourite song.

References 

1961
Countries in the Eurovision Song Contest 1961
Eurovision